Quoit is a settlement in mid Cornwall, United Kingdom. It is situated in the parish of St. Columb Major approximately one mile (2 km) southeast of the town of St Columb Major  and 7 miles (12 km) east of Newquay. It lies between the A30 dual carriageway trunk road and the A39 road through St Columb Major.

Devil's Quoit
Although one support stone was removed in the 18th century, the dolmen was still standing in 1840. It partially collapsed between 1840 and 1850. By the 20th century, the stones had been split and either deliberately buried or incorporated in surrounding hedges.

References

Hamlets in Cornwall